HD 99015, also known as HR 4397 or rarely 31 G. Chamaeleontis, is a solitary white-hued star located in the southern circumpolar constellation Chamaeleon. It has an apparent magnitude of 6.42, placing it near the limit for naked eye visibility even in ideal conditions. At its current distance, HD 99015's brightness is diminished by 0.31 magnitudes due to interstellar dust. It has an absolute magnitude of +2.08.

This is an ordinary A-type main-sequence star with a stellar classification of A5 V. However, Nancy Houk and A. P. Cowley gave a class of A5 III/IV, indicating that it is instead an evolved A-type star with the luminosity class of a subgiant and giant star. It has 1.87 times the mass of the Sun and 1.83 times the solar radius. HD 99015 is somewhat metal enriched ([Fe/H] = +0.15) and is estimated to be 854 million years old.

References

A-type main-sequence stars
Chamaeleon (constellation)
Chamaeleon, 31
CD-76 00495
099015
055497
4397
High-proper-motion stars